Yes, But... is a 2001 French comedy film written and directed by Yves Lavandier, dealing with brief therapy and teenage sexuality.

Plot
Attracted but also frightened by her sexuality, a teenage girl undergoes a brief therapy with a warm, humorous and competent psychotherapist.

Cast
Émilie Dequenne as Eglantine Laville
Gérard Jugnot as Erwann Moenner
Alix de Konopka as Mme Laville
Cyrille Thouvenin as Sébastien
Patrick Bonnel as M. Laville
Vanessa Jarry as Françoise

Background
Yes, But... shows a brief therapy (and not a psychoanalysis) with all its techniques: transactional analysis, gestalt, Ericksonian hypnosis, systemic therapy, paradoxical prescriptions, humor, visualisation.

Richard Fisch, director of the Brief Therapy Center in Palo Alto, called Yes, But... "a gem". Psychotherapist Alan D. Entin says Yes, But... gives a very accurate portrayal of his occupation.

References

External links
 
 
 Richard Fisch on Yes, But...
 Alan D. Entin on Yes, But...

2001 films
2001 comedy films
2000s teen comedy films
2000s French-language films
French teen comedy films
Films shot in Lyon
2000s French films